O. indicus may refer to:

 Olenecamptus indicus, a species of beetle
 Onustus indicus, a species of large sea snail
 Ophichthys indicus, the Bombay swamp eel
 Orthogonius indicus, a species of ground beetle
 Oryctocephalus indicus, a species of corynexochid trilobite

Synonyms 
Odontotermes feae, a small species of earth dwelling termite

See also
 Indicus (disambiguation)